Blondie is a 1938 American comedy film directed by Frank Strayer, based on the comic strip of the same name, created by Chic Young. The screenplay was written by Richard Flournoy.  
The plot involves the Bumsteads' fifth anniversary, Dagwood trying to get a raise, and Blondie trying to buy new furniture.

This was the first of 28 films based on the comic strip; Columbia Pictures produced them from 1938 to 1943, and popular demand brought them back in 1945. When the Blondie film series came to an end with Beware of Blondie in 1950, it was announced as being replaced with a series of Gasoline Alley movies. However, only two such films were made, Gasoline Alley (1951) and Corky of Gasoline Alley (1951). Columbia then reissued the Blondie features, beginning with the first film in the series.

Columbia used the series to showcase many of its contract players. Rita Hayworth was featured in Blondie on a Budget; Glenn Ford in Blondie Plays Cupid, Larry Parks and Janet Blair in Blondie Goes to College, Shemp Howard in Blondie Knows Best, and Adele Jergens in Blondie's Anniversary. Other roles were taken by Columbia contractees Doris Houck, Bruce Bennett, Lloyd Bridges, Ann Doran, Stanley Brown, Richard Fiske, Bud Jamison, Eddie Laughton, John Tyrrell, Alyn Lockwood, Jimmy Lloyd, Gay Nelson, and Ross Ford.

Plot summary
Dagwood Bumstead is a good-natured but scatterbrained young salesman at the Dithers Construction company office, with a wife, young son, and dog.  He often arrives at work barely on time, after clumsily colliding on foot with the mail carrier.  In this pilot episode, Blondie secretly orders new furniture on credit for their anniversary, not realizing Dagwood is broke because he had helped out a needy friend.  Mr. Dithers sends Dagwood to a hotel with orders to have a guest there, Mr. Hazlip, sign a valuable construction contract, but the reluctant Hazlip has the hotel clerk tell Dagwood he is not in.  While lounging on a lobby couch, Dagwood and another gentleman notice that the hotel's vacuum cleaner is broken, and they sneak it into the other man's room where the two of them bond while wasting hours, for fun, trying to repair it, although it's none of their business.  Blondie phones and mistakenly thinks the man's daughter, whom she's never met, is Dagwood's paramour, and asks for a divorce.  Meanwhile, Blondie's parents and amorous ex-boyfriend visit her, and the new furniture is repossessed by movers in front of their eyes.  Dagwood, though unlicensed, borrows the parents' car without permission, and collides with a policeman, who notices the stolen vacuum cleaner in it bearing the hotel's name.  In court, Blondie pleads with the judge not to jail her husband.  To everyone's surprise, the vacuum cleaner gentleman is revealed as the valuable client Mr. Hazlip whom Dagwood had been trying to contact.  He willingly signs the Dithers contract, and Blondie negotiates a raise and promotion for Dagwood.

Cast

 Penny Singleton as Blondie Bumstead
 Arthur Lake as Dagwood Bumstead
 Larry Simms as Alexander "Baby Dumpling" Bumstead
 Gene Lockhart as Clarence Percival "C.P." Hazlip
 Jonathan Hale as J.C. Dithers
 Gordon Oliver as Chester Franey
 Danny Mummert as Alvin Fuddle
 Kathleen Lockhart as Mrs. Miller (Blondie's mother)
 Ann Doran as Elsie Hazlip
 Dorothy Moore as Dot Miller (Blondie's sister)
 Fay Helm as Mrs. Fuddle
 Emory Parnell as Police Desk Sergeant
 Willie Best as Hotel Porter (uncredited)
 Ian Wolfe as Judge
 Irving Bacon as Mr. Beazley, Letter Carrier
 Dick Curtis as Daily Gazette Reporter
 Edgar Dearing as Hotel Policeman
 Richard Fiske as Nelson, Dithers' Employee
 James Flavin as Policeman in Accident
 Bud Jamison as Repossessor
 Charles Lane as Furniture Salesperson
 David Newell as First Draftsperson
 Emory Parnell as Police Desk Sergeant
 John Rand as Gardener

Films
Twenty-eight films were produced by Columbia Pictures between 1938 and 1950:

 Blondie (1938)
 Blondie Meets the Boss (1939)
 Blondie Takes a Vacation (1939)
 Blondie Brings Up Baby (1939)
 Blondie on a Budget (1940)
 Blondie Has Servant Trouble (1940)
 Blondie Plays Cupid (1940)
 Blondie Goes Latin (1941)
 Blondie in Society (1941)
 Blondie Goes to College (1942)
 Blondie's Blessed Event (1942)
 Blondie for Victory (1942)
 It's a Great Life (1943)
 Footlight Glamour (1943)
 Leave It to Blondie (1945)
 Life with Blondie (1945)
 Blondie's Lucky Day (1946)
 Blondie Knows Best (1946)
 Blondie's Big Moment (1947)
 Blondie's Holiday (1947)
 Blondie in the Dough (1947)
 Blondie's Anniversary (1947)
 Blondie's Reward (1948)
 Blondie's Secret (1948)
 Blondie's Big Deal (1949)
 Blondie Hits the Jackpot (1949)
 Blondie's Hero (1950)
 Beware of Blondie (1950)

Preservation 
Blondie was preserved and restored by the UCLA Film and Television Archive. The restoration's funding was provided by the Packard Humanities Institute. The restoration premiered at the UCLA Festival of Preservation in 2022.

References

Further reading
Blondie Goes to Hollywood, by Carol Lynn Scherling. Albany, 2010. BearManor Media. .

External links
 
 
 
 
 Blondie: The Movie Series
 

1938 films
Columbia Pictures films
American black-and-white films
Blondie (film series) films
1938 comedy films
Films directed by Frank R. Strayer
Films scored by Leigh Harline
1930s English-language films
1930s American films